The 1971 New Zealand gallantry awards were announced via four Special Honours Lists dated 7 May, 27 May, 27 September and 19 October 1971, and recognised 12 New Zealand military personnel for gallantry during operations in Vietnam.

Order of the British Empire

Member (MBE)
Military division, for gallantry
 Warrant Officer First Class Richard Rex Hudson – Royal Regiment of New Zealand Artillery.

Distinguished Flying Cross (DFC)
 Flight Lieutenant Douglas Ian Paterson – Royal New Zealand Air Force; of Woodville.

Military Medal (MM)
 Corporal Roland Joseph Horopapera – Royal New Zealand Infantry Regiment.
 Private Robert Wayne Day – Royal New Zealand Infantry Regiment.

Mention in despatches
 Captain William Anthony Blair – Royal New Zealand Infantry Regiment.
 Sergeant Graeme Cecil Faulkner – Royal New Zealand Infantry Regiment.
 Lieutenant Alastair Ronald Forrest MacKenzie – Royal New Zealand Infantry Regiment.
 Squadron Leader John Lambert Alexander Pendreigh – Royal New Zealand Air Force; of Wanganui.
 Lance Corporal William Charles Teller – Royal New Zealand Infantry Regiment.
 Major Evan John Torrance – Royal New Zealand Infantry Regiment.
 Flight Lieutenant Gordon Lennox Wood – Royal New Zealand Air Force.
 Sergeant Jersey Bassett Yandall – Royal New Zealand Infantry Regiment.

References

Gallantry awards
New Zealand gallantry awards